Sivaprasad "Prasad" Gogineni is an American engineer, currently the Cudworth Professor of Engineering at University of Alabama and formerly the Deane E. Ackers Distinguished Professor at University of Kansas.

References

Year of birth missing (living people)
Living people
University of Kansas faculty
University of Alabama faculty
21st-century American engineers
University of Kansas alumni